Locomotor may refer to:
 Locomotor, the Dutch equivalent of the German Kleinlokomotive, a locomotive of small size and low power for light shunting duties
 Locomotor activity
 Locomotor ataxia
 Locomotor effects of shoes
 Locomotor stimulation
 Locomotor system (disambiguation)

See also 
 Locomotion (disambiguation)
 Locomotive (disambiguation)